Avesta AIK is a Swedish football club located in Avesta, Sweden.

Background
The club was founded in February 1905 as Avesta Absolutisters Idrottsklubb. The name was changed to Avesta Allmänna Idrottsklubb in 1916. The club now only participates in football but over the years has undertaken many different sports such as bandy, table tennis, boxing, athletics, gymnastics, skiing and bowling. The club has grown from 24 members at its inception to over 800 members at the present day.

Since their foundation Avesta AIK has participated mainly in the upper and middle divisions of the Swedish football league system. The club currently plays in Division 3 Södra Norrland which is the fifth tier of Swedish football. They play their home matches at the Avestavallen in Avesta.

Avesta AIK are affiliated to Dalarnas Fotbollförbund.

History
Avesta AIK has competed in the following divisions:

Attendances

In recent seasons Avesta AIK have had the following average attendances:

The attendance record was set in 1961 when 4,498 people attended the match with IK Brage.

Footnotes

External links
 Avesta AIK – Official website
  Avesta AIK Facebook

Sport in Dalarna County
Football clubs in Dalarna County
Association football clubs established in 1905
Bandy clubs established in 1905
Defunct bandy clubs in Sweden
1905 establishments in Sweden